The United States Army Finance Corps is a combat service support (CSS) branch of the United States Army. The Finance Corps traces its foundation to 16 June 1775, when the Second Continental Congress established the office of Paymaster General of the Army. The Pay Department became a separate department in 1816, and the Finance Department was created by law on 1 July 1920. It became the Finance Corps in 1950. It is responsible for financial operations, most notably payroll and resource management.

Finance Corps units
Corps-level financial management formations exist in Europe, South Korea, and at Fort Bragg, North Carolina, and at Fort Hood, Texas.

The 18th Financial Management Support Center (18 FMSC) provides financial management services to the units of the XVIII Airborne Corps. It is based at Fort Bragg (North Carolina) and its higher headquarters (HQ) is the 1st Theater Sustainment Command (1st TSC)Fort Bragg, North Carolina. The 18th FMSC is responsible for the 24th Financial Management Company (FMCO), the 33rd FMCO, the 82nd FMCO, the 101st FMCO, and the 126th FMCO. 
The mission of the 18th Financial Management Center is:
Rapidly deploy as part of the crisis response force by air, sea and land anywhere in the world.
Provide financial management support for joint and combined operations (Central Funding, Disbursing, Accounting, Vendor Services, Policy and Internal Controls).
Provide technical oversight and coordination to designated CONUS-based Financial Management Companies preparing to deploy in concert with the Army Force Generation Cycle.
Direct employment of non-deployed FM Companies in support of the Installation finance mission in accordance with Assistant Secretary of the Army (Financial Management and Comptroller) (ASA FM&C) guidance

In early 1998 the Commanding General of United States Army Forces Command approved a request from the CG, XVIII Airborne Corps to combine the 18th Finance Group and the 18th Personnel Group (Airborne); to establish a provisional 18th Soldier Support Group (18th SSG) at Ft. Hood; to form SSBs at Forts Stewart, Drum and Campbell; and, to combine the two remaining Finance Battalions at Ft. Bragg. The General Officer Steering Committee (GOSC) did not support the XVIII consolidations as proposed. This decision was made without the benefit of the TRADOC force development process which was Phase 2 of the Service to the Soldier Study. It was not a foregone conclusion that SSBs and SSGs would be implemented Army-Wide. FORSCOM and XVIII Airborne Corps were forging ahead of the Soldier Support Institute study as it was expedient to do so due to the impending force reductions.

Other higher finance formations include:
13th Finance Group, Fort Hood (III Corps)
1st Finance Battalion
4th Finance Battalion
15th Finance Battalion 
215th Finance Battalion
266th Finance Management Center (United States Army Europe)
208th Finance Management Company 
Italy and Benelux offices
175th Finance Center (Yongsan, South Korea) (Eighth United States Army)
3rd Finance Group
5th Finance Group
7th Finance Group
9th Finance Group 
220th Finance Group

Battalions and sections

9th Finance Battalion 
24th Finance Battalion 
25th Infantry Division Finance Section
27th Finance Battalion 
30th Finance Battalion
39th Finance Battalion
49th Finance Battalion
82nd Finance Battalion  
101st Finance Battalion 
105th Finance Battalion 
106th Finance Battalion 
107th Finance Battalion 
125th Finance Battalion  
126th Finance Battalion 
126th Finance Section 

130th Finance Battalion 
147th Finance Battalion
158th Finance Battalion
176th Finance Battalion
177th Finance Battalion  
230th Finance Battalion 
267th Finance Battalion 
325th Finance Battalion 
338th Finance Battalion
374th Finance Battalion
376th Finance Battalion
395th Finance Battalion
453rd Finance Battalion
501st Finance Battalion

Army Reserve & National Guard
469th Financial Management Support Center (USAR) (New Orleans, Louisiana)
336th Financial Management Support Center (USAR) (Lake Charles, Louisiana) (Supports Operation Bright Star)
326th Financial Management Support Center (USAR) (Los Angeles, California)
398th Finance Management Support Center (United States Army Reserve) Fort Belvoir VA, a Major Subordinate Command under the 99th Regional Readiness Center.
28th Finance Battalion (PA)
40th Finance Battalion (CA)
50th Finance Battalion (New Jersey Army National Guard)
138th Finance Battalion (IN)  
153d Finance Battalion (FL) 
210th Finance Battalion (MS)
726th Finance Battalion (MA)
93rd Financial Management Support Unit (GA)
224th Financial Management Support Unit(CA)
368th Financial Management Support Unit(KS)
374th Financial Management Support Unit(MD)
376th Financial Management Support Unit(WI)
395th Financial Management Support Unit(UT)
147th Financial Management Support Detachment (Minnesota Army National Guard)
247th Financial Management Support Detachment (Minnesota Army National Guard)
1863rd Financial Management Support Detachment (Illinois Army National Guard)
 49th Financial Management Support Unit (TX Army National Guard)
 149th Financial Management Support Detachment (TX Army National Guard)
 160th Financial Management Support Detachment (AZ Army National Guard)
 249th Financial Management Support Detachment (TX Army National Guard)

List of commanders

References

External links 
Financial Management School page
Finance Corps Insignia and Plaques
U.S. Army Finance Corps Association
Army Financial Management School milSuite

Branches of the United States Army
Military units and formations established in 1920
1920 establishments in the United States